Neocollyris rubens is a species of ground beetle in the genus Neocollyris in the subfamily Carabinae. It was described by Henry Walter Bates in 1875.

References

Rubens, Neocollyris
Beetles described in 1875